Callicrania is a genus of European bush crickets in the tribe Ephippigerini, first described by Ignacio Bolívar in 1898 as "Ephippigera (Callicrania)".  To date (2022), species have only been recorded from the Iberian peninsula.

Species 
The Orthoptera Species File lists:
subgenus Callicrania Bolívar, 1898
 Callicrania belarrensis Barat, 2007
 Callicrania denticulata Barat, 2007
 Callicrania plaxicauda Barat, 2007
 Callicrania ramburii (Bolívar, 1878) - type species (as Ephippiger ramburii Bolívar,  by subsequent designation
subgenus Mucrocallicrania Barat, 2007
 Callicrania demandae (Schroeter & Pfau, 1987)
 Callicrania faberi (Harz, 1975)
 Callicrania vicentae Barat, 2007

References

External links 

Orthoptera of Europe
Ensifera genera
Bradyporinae